Babulnath Mandir is an ancient Shiva mandir in Mumbai, India. Situated on a small hillock near Girgaum Chowpatty, it is one of oldest mandirs in the city, Shiva in the form of the Lord of the Babul tree is the main deity in this temple. The faithful climb up to the mandir and obtain Darshan of the shivling and obtain blessings of the Lord. It is also possible to take an elevator up to the temple. The temples is visited by lakhs of devotees on annual Mahashivratri festival.

Since Raja Bhimdev's Time

Babulnath Temple Shiva Linga and Idols were originally consecrated in the 12th century by the then Hindu king Bhimdev of the region. Over a period of time the temple was buried and lost over a period of time. The idols were re-discovered (unearthed) during the period of 1700 to 1780.  The first temple was built in the 1780 year. 

When rediscovered, 5 original idols were dug out. That of the main Shiva Linga, Ganesh, Hanuman, Parvati and one more. Out of this the first four are in the temple. The fifth one was immersed in the sea because it was broken when it was dug out in the 18th century. Very famous temple in the 21st century, known for the active blessings.

History
When the first temple was built, the land belonged to the Parsi community. There were 5 Dakhma's (Parsi final resting place) existing in the vicinity. There was a lot of resistance for the Parsi community at that time for the building of the temple. This resistance continued till late 1800 when the issue was settled by the courts in favour of the temple.

Old Temple
The Babulnath Mandir was patronised when built for the first time by Hindu merchant of that time. A bigger temple was built in 1890 by contributions from the  Maharaja Sayajirao Gaikwad of Baroda state. The current temple structure can be dated back to 1890.  The temple height was considerable when built in 1890 but a lightning strike in the 1960s and damage to the spire lowered the height of the present temple considerably. Till the 1980s Babulnath Temple was one of the Tallest structure & location in the city of Mumbai.

There is limited reference to Babulnath Temple in the historical texts, because in the initial days the temple was frequented by yogis who used to stay there for "Dhyan" (Quiet & Concentrated Meditation) and remain quietly in the vicinity/radius of the Shivling's vibrations.  However the temple famed in the 20th century. Currently the temple is thronged by people on Mondays and during Mahashivratri & Shravan months.

Legend
About Babulnath Temple, Mumbai
	
Legend has it that about two centuries ago, the southeast portion of the hilly terrain known as the Malabar Hill, where Lord Babulnath's ancient temple is situated, belonged to one Pandurang, a rich goldsmith. His cattle were grazing around.

Being grazing land, there was nothing to be taken care of by Babul, the caretaker of Pandurang's cattle stock.

Once it was noticed that a cow Kapila stopped giving milk. On enquiry, Babul reported that the very cow, before coming home reaches a point and suo-moto puts out all her milk. Babul could not explain the logic behind this, but had made Pandurang inquisitive.

The very next day, Panduranga saw the scene again and he was overwhelmed when the said cow, Kapila was repeating her usual act. On reaching there a huge Shivaling was found. It is the very place where the temple has been built.

References

External links

Shri Babulnath Mandir website

Hindu temples in Mumbai
18th-century Hindu temples
Shiva temples in Maharashtra